Paul Bunge (1839–1888) is credited as the inventor of the short-beam analytical balance in 1866. The eponymous Paul Bunge Prize is awarded each year for outstanding publications in the history of scientific instruments.

Though short-beam balances were in use before 1866, Bunge was the first engineer to document a theory for their operation and started manufacturing the balances in Hamburg. It was Florenz Sartorius who from 1870 started the mass production of the scientific balances in his business in Göttingen.

References 

19th-century German inventors
1839 births
1888 deaths
Engineers from Hamburg
German mechanical engineers